The sport casting events of World Games I were held on July 29–August 2, 1981, at Gunderson High School in San Jose, California, in the United States. These were the first World Games, an international quadrennial multi-sport event, and were hosted by the city of Santa Clara.  The World Casting Championships were held simultaneously and included women, juniors and pros. The only World Games casting events were these 11 men’s contests.  Casters from the United States won 18 of the 33 medals awarded, with Steve Rajeff collecting four gold medals.

Casting is the act of using a fishing rod and reel and accurately throwing the lure in a specific spot.

Medalists
Sources:

Details

Fly skish accuracy

(first 11 places decided in a cast-off)

1. Harold Maehle, Norway, 100 points

2. Chris Korich, USA, 100

3. Harald Meindl, Austria, 100

4. John Waters, Australia, 100

5. Guido Vinck, Belgium, 100

6. Ron Reeves, Australia, 100

7. Raphael Lasseet, Belgium, 100

8. Bjorn Rogler, Norway, 100

9. Stefan Mantier, Austria, 100

10. James Tomlinson, Scotland, 100

11. Oyvind Forland, Norway, 100

Spinning accuracy Arenburg target

(ties broken in castoff)

1. Guid Vinck, Belgium, 100 points

2. Harold Maehle, Norway, 98

3. Steve Rajeff, USA, 98

4. Felix Roth, Switzerland, 98

5. Ron Reeves, Australia, 98

6. B.L. Farley, USA, 96

followed by at least 25 others

Spinning accuracy skish

(ties broken in castoff)

1. Oyvind Forland, Norway, 100

2. Tom Martens, Netherlands, 100

3. Helmut Hochwartner, Austria, 100

4. Felix Roth, Switzerland, 100

5. Harold Maehle, Norway, 100

6. Tim Rajeff, USA, 95

followed by at least 24 others

Fly distance single handed

1. Steve Rajeff, USA, 67.12 m

2. Peter Hayes, Australia, 64.43 m

3. Oyvind Forland, Norway, 63.39 m

Fly distance double handed

1. Steve Rajeff, USA, 79.94 m

2. Chris Korich, USA, 79.04 m

3. Oyvind Forland, Norway, 76.34 m

Spinning distance single handed

1. Ernst Rohatsch, Austria, 73.33m, 109.99 points

2. Peter Klausier, Switzerland, 71.94m, 107.91

3. Steve Rajeff, USA, 71.23m, 106.84

Spinning distance double handed

1. Chris Korich, USA, 122.06, 183.09 points

2. Helmut Hochwartner, Austria, 118.56, 178.84
 
3. Kevin Carriero, USA, 116.87, 175.30

Multiplier accuracy

1. Øyvind Førland, NOR

2. Chris Korich, USA

3. Zack Wilson, USA

Multiplier distance single handed

1. Steve Rajeff, USA

2. Chris Korich, USA

3. Zack Wilson, USA

Multiplier distance double handed

1. Steve Rajeff, USA

2. Art Walker, Canada

3. Keith Pryor, USA

All-round

1. Steve Rajeff, USA

2. Chris Korich, USA

3. Tim Rajeff, USA

References

1981
1981 World Games
Fishing tournaments